Jacqueline "Jackie" Buscarino is an American voice actress, writer and producer. She has contributed voice-over work to animated series such as The Marvelous Misadventures of Flapjack, Adventure Time and Gravity Falls. She was the producer of the Cartoon Network series Steven Universe and its sequel Steven Universe Future, where she also voiced the character of Vidalia. Buscarino also starred in the lead role as Jackie in the 2003 independent live action film My Life with Morrissey.

Alongside Justin Roiland and Ryan Ridley, she co-hosted The Grandma's Virginity Podcast.  The first guest she invited on the podcast was Kent Osborne.

Filmography

Television

Voice roles

References

External links

1977 births
American voice actresses
American women television producers
Television producers from California
American television writers
Living people
American women television writers
Actresses from Los Angeles
21st-century American women